Old Leighlin was a constituency represented in the Irish House of Commons, the lower house in the Irish Parliament of the Kingdom of Ireland. It based in Old Leighlin, near the town of Leighlinbridge in County Carlow. It was a bishop's borough, controlled by the Church of Ireland Bishop of Ferns and Leighlin.

The borough was disenfranchised by the Acts of Union 1800, with effect from 1 January 1801. £15,000 was paid to the Commissioners of First Fruits to be used at their discretion.

Members of Parliament

Notes

References

 Johnston-Liik, E. M. (2002). History of the Irish Parliament, 1692–1800, Publisher: Ulster Historical Foundation (28 Feb 2002),  
 

Return of Members of Parliament (1878) vol. ii, p. 607.

Constituencies of the Parliament of Ireland (pre-1801)
Historic constituencies in County Carlow
1800 disestablishments in Ireland
Constituencies disestablished in 1800